Aemilia testudo is a moth of the family Erebidae. It was described by George Hampson in 1901. It is found in Peru.

References

Moths described in 1901
Phaegopterina
Moths of South America